Darkwing Duck is an American animated television series produced by The Walt Disney Company. It originally aired on the syndicated programming block The Disney Afternoon and later Saturday mornings on ABC from 1991 to 1992. Reruns of the series continued to air on The Disney Afternoon until 1995 and again between 1996 and 1997. The series originally aired as a preview-run on The Disney Channel in the spring of 1991 before beginning its main runs in September of that year. Episode air dates for this preview-run are not currently available. The series featured an eponymous superhero anthropomorphic duck with the alter ego of Drake Mallard, voiced by Jim Cummings. It is the first of two spin-offs of DuckTales, the other being Quack Pack.

A total of 91 episodes were made. Of those, 65 aired in syndication on The Disney Afternoon in the 1991–1992 season (the first two episodes aired as a combined hour-long broadcast of the pilot episode "Darkly Dawns the Duck" the weekend before the series began its weekday run), with 13 more simultaneously airing on Saturdays on ABC in the fall of 1991. Another 13 episodes aired on Saturdays on ABC in the fall of 1992.

The pilot episode "Darkly Dawns the Duck" originally aired on the weekend of Friday, September 6, 1991 (the air date varied by market) as part of a larger syndicated TV special called The Darkwing Duck Premiere / Back to School with the Mickey Mouse Club. Afterwards, "Darkly Dawns the Duck" was edited into a two-part version in which the two parts were treated as two distinct episodes. It is unknown when this two-part version first aired.

The Disney Afternoon episodes and the first 13 ABC episodes are listed separately. In fact, they constituted a single production season, but Disney originally kept the ABC episodes separate from the syndicated episodes for distribution purposes. The first ABC season was re-aired on The Disney Afternoon in the fall of 1992. The second ABC season was not aired on The Disney Afternoon until the fall of 1993, after ABC removed the series from its schedule.

Since the syndicated and ABC episodes are separated here, episodes are not listed according to their broadcast chronology. In addition, even the broadcast order of the first 78 episodes does not reflect their in-universe chronology – for example, Liquidator's origin episode "Dry Hard" was aired after his appearances in "Just Us Justice Ducks" and "Life, the Negaverse and Everything". The series' production order (with the exception of "Darkly Dawns the Duck") most closely reflects the intended chronological episode order.

Series overview

Episodes

Season 1 (1991–92)

Season 2 (1991)

Season 3 (1992)

See also
DuckTales

References

External links

Darkwing Episode Guide episode guide with synopses and reviews
The Darkwing Duck Episode Guide yet another guide with synopses, quotes, and writers and characters for each episode

Lists of American children's animated television series episodes
Episodes
Lists of Disney Channel television series episodes